McGourty or McGoorty is a surname. Notable people with the surname include:

Allison McGourty (born 1964), English music industry executive
CJ McGourty, Northern Irish Gaelic footballer and hurler
Catherine McGourty, Northern Irish camogie player
 Eddie McGoorty (1889–1929), American middleweight boxer
 John P. McGoorty (1866–1953), American judge and politician
Kevin McGourty, Irish Gaelic footballer

See also
McCourty